Cylindrocarpon musae is a fungal plant pathogen that causes root rot in banana.

References

External links 
 Index Fungorum
 USDA ARS Fungal Database

Nectriaceae
Fungal plant pathogens and diseases
Banana diseases
Fungi described in 1974